Howard Edward Lebengood (April 23, 1902 – January 20, 1980) was a professional American football player for the Pottsville Maroons of the National Football League in 1925.  Lebengood played for the Maroons for his entire 1 year NFL career. Lebengood helped the Maroons win the 1925 NFL Championship, before it was stripped from the team due to a disputed rules violation. 

Prior to joining the Maroons, Lebengood attended Villanova University, where he also played at the college football.

References
Howard Lebengood's profile at NFL.com

1902 births
1980 deaths
Players of American football from Pennsylvania
People from Schuylkill County, Pennsylvania
Pottsville Maroons players
Villanova Wildcats football players